Edward Beech (March 1862 – 30 May 1933) was a South African first-class cricketer. He played for Kimberley in the 1889–90 Currie Cup.

References

External links
 

1862 births
1933 deaths
South African cricketers
Griqualand West cricketers
Cricketers from Greater London